RushmoreDrive was launched in April 2008, and was the first search engine for the Black community. It was co-founded by Johnny C. Taylor, Jr., Kevin McFall, and Brad Gebert It delivered a blend of mainstream search results plus a layer of more relevant search results influenced by the Black community.

RushmoreDrive News was a tool that enabled the Black community to find news headlines from the entire World Wide Web, including well known Black media, blogs and countless relevant on-line voices, as well as recognized mainstream news sources.

The search engine company was dissolved in 2009.

References
 http://www.marketwatch.com/story/rushmoredrivecom-announces-strategic-partnership-with

Internet search engines
IAC (company)